The 2012 Columbia Lions football team represented Columbia University in the 2012 NCAA Division I FCS football season. They were led by first year head coach Pete Mangurian and played their home games at Robert K. Kraft Field at Lawrence A. Wien Stadium. They are a member of the Ivy League. They finished the season 3–7, 2–5 in Ivy League play to finish in a tie for sixth place. Columbia averaged 5,599 fans per game.

Schedule

References

Columbia
Columbia Lions football seasons
Columbia Lions football